WWXY-LD (channel 38) is a independent television station licensed to San Juan, Puerto Rico. The station is owned by Héctor Marcano Martinez. WWXY-LD's studios are located at the Metro Tower in Ave. Ponce de Leon in Santurce and its transmitter at Cerro la Marquesa in Aguas Buenas.

History
On September 25, 2017, Due to the passage of Hurricane Irma and Hurricane Maria in Puerto Rico, WIPR-TV (owned by Puerto Rico Public Broadcasting Corporation) simulcast programming on channel 38.1, The Retro Channel on 38.2 and WORO-DT (TeleOro Canal 13) operate on channel 38.3.

On January 1, 2022, WWXY-LD ended its TuBox TV streaming service and became a news-intensive independent station, branded as Acción TV, which simulcast iHeartMedia's Acción Radio programming from its studios in Orlando, Florida. On September 1, 2022, WWXY-LD returns as a general entertainment independent station, rebranding itself as TVO.

Programming
WWXY-LD primarily features news and talk programming, including local programs produced by Marcom Group. Also, WWXY-LD shows public affairs & children's programming. WWXY-LD also broadcasts religious programming from Maranatha Radio Ministries. Paid programming is shown at other times of the day.

Digital television
The station's digital signal is multiplexed:

References

External links

WXY-LD
Mass media in San Juan, Puerto Rico
Low-power television stations in the United States
Independent television stations
1998 establishments in Puerto Rico
Television channels and stations established in 1998